Love Keeps Kicking is the third studio album by the English band Martha. It was originally released on 5 April 2019 by Big Scary Monsters in the UK/EU and Dirtnap Records in the US.

Release
Martha released the album's first single, "Heart Is Healing", in December 2018, followed by the album's lead single, "Love Keeps Kicking", in January 2019. The album's third single, "Into This", was released in February 2019.

Around the album's release, the band received profiles from major music and culture magazines Rolling Stone and NME.

The album includes references to the WWE's signature event Wrestlemania, and the American bands Huey Lewis and the News and Against Me!.

Tracks "The Void" and "Lucy Shone a Light on You" are both part of a narrative started on "The Ballad of Lucy Connor (Part 1)" — a track from their first EP — with the former being parts of a story written by the titular character that is referenced in the latter.

Track listing

Personnel
 J.C. Cairns – vocals, guitar
 Daniel Ellis – vocals, guitar
 Naomi Griffin – vocals, bass
 Nathan Stephens-Griffin – vocals, drums

References

2019 albums
Martha (band) albums